Andrzej Stelmach (born 15 August 1972) is a Polish former volleyball player, a member of Poland men's national volleyball team in 1990–2005 and head coach of Polish female club KU AZS Politechnika Śląska, a participant of the Olympic Games (Atlanta 1996, Athens 2004), six-time Polish Champion (1993, 1994, 1995, 1997, 2005, 2006).

Personal life
He has brother Krzysztof, who is former volleyball player and coach. He has a son Kacper (born 1997) who also is professional volleyball player in PlusLiga.

Career as coach
In season 2015/16 he was coach of BBTS Bielsko-Biała. In 2016 he went to Polish female club KU AZS Politechnika Śląska in 1st Polish League.

Sporting achievements

Clubs

CEV Cup Winner's Cup 
  2000, with Pallavolo Padova

National championships
 1990/1991  Polish Championship, with AZS Częstochowa
 1991/1992  Polish Championship, with AZS Częstochowa
 1992/1993  Polish Championship, with AZS Częstochowa
 1993/1994  Polish Championship, with AZS Częstochowa
 1994/1995  Polish Championship, with AZS Częstochowa
 1995/1996  Polish Championship, with AZS Częstochowa
 1996/1997  Polish Championship, with AZS Częstochowa
 1998/1999  Italian SuperCup, with Pallavolo Padova
 2004/2005  Polish Cup, with Skra Bełchatów
 2004/2005  Polish Championship, with Skra Bełchatów
 2005/2006  Polish Cup, with Skra Bełchatów
 2005/2006  Polish Championship, with Skra Bełchatów
 2007/2008  Polish Championship, with AZS Częstochowa

References

1972 births
Living people
People from Strzegom
Sportspeople from Lower Silesian Voivodeship
Polish men's volleyball players
Volleyball players at the 1996 Summer Olympics
Volleyball players at the 2004 Summer Olympics
Olympic volleyball players of Poland
AZS Olsztyn players
AZS Częstochowa players
Skra Bełchatów players